133rd meridian may refer to:

133rd meridian east, a line of longitude east of the Greenwich Meridian
133rd meridian west, a line of longitude west of the Greenwich Meridian